James Francis Cooke (November 14, 1875, Bay City, Michigan – March 3, 1960, Bala Cynwyd, Pennsylvania) spent his life involved with music. He was a pianist, composer, playwright, journalist, author (including novels and of books on musical history and theory), a president of Theodore Presser music publishers from 1925 to 1936, and editor of The Etude music magazine from 1907 to 1950, or 1913 to 1956. He taught piano for more than twenty years in New York, led choral clubs and taught voice. He also gave music-topic lectures.

His work was in the field of music education, and he was the president of the Philadelphia Music Teacher's Association for seven years. He was president of the Presser Foundation for 38 years. He was also a member of the American Society of Composers, Authors and Publishers, the Union League and the Sons of the American Revolution.

Family
He married Betsey Ella Beckwith (born Toledo, Ohio, 1896)  in 1899. She was a concert singer. They had two sons, Carol Lincoln Cooke (born 1900, died in childhood) and Francis Sherman Cooke (born 1905). The family was recorded in the U.S. Censuses, passport application and ship's travel logs (look at see also section for links).

Education
Cooke was educated in the New York public schools at Brooklyn, including Boys High School. He studied music with R. Huntington Woodman, Walter Henry Hall, Charles Dunham, Dudley Buck, Ernst Eberhard and William Medorn in New York. He also studied at the Brooklyn Institute.

He attended the Royal Conservatory in Wurzburg, Germany in 1900. There he studied under Dr. K. Kliebert, Max Meyer-Olbersleben and music historian and composer Hermann Ritter.

He received his doctorate in music from the University of the State of New York in 1906. In 1919, he received a doctorate in music from the Ohio Northern University.

John Philip Sousa
In the course of his interviewing and talking with the musicians of his day, Cooke became a "close friend and associate" with John Philip Sousa. As president of the Theodore Presser Company, Cooke published some of the Sousa's works.  In 1924 he helped to increase the sales of one of Sousa's pieces by changing its name from March of the Mitten Men to Power and Glory - Fraternal March. He also wrote words to go with Sousa's A Serenade In Seville in 1924. Sousa visited him shortly before his death, and talked to him about the lack of religion in modern music as a failing. The two attended a play "If Booth Had Missed." Two days later, Sousa died of a heart attack.

Composer
Three of his works were recorded and released by Victor Records. Ol' Car'lina (1921) featured soprano Amelita Galli-Curci doing a vocal solo, backed by orchestra. The Angelus (1926)  featured a vocal solo by Elsie Baker, also backed by orchestra. Sea gardens (1929) had Rosario Bourdon playing with the Victor Symphonic Band.

Cooke composed for piano. Piano solos include: White Orchids (1941), Mountain Shower (1943), Roses at Dawn (1945), and Ballet Mignon (1948). He wrote the music and poem published together as Sea Gardens (1925). Wrote words to In a Garden Filled With Roses (1939) to a melody by Charles Wakefield Cadman.

Author

He wrote the following books:
 Standard History of Music: A First History for Students of All Ages, 1910
 Great Pianists on Piano Playing, 1913 (first edition contained 21 chapters; second edition in 1917 contained 9 new chapters)
 Mastering the Scales and Arpeggios, 1913
 Musical Playlets, 1917
 Music-Masters Old and New.
 Great Singers on the Art of Singing
 Young Folks' Picture History of Music, 1925
 Master Study in Music
 A Fight in Defense of Music
 Musical travelogues; little visits to European musical shrines for the casual traveler, the music lover, the student and the teacher, 1934
 Musical plays for young folks: Scenes from the lives of the great composers, 1934
 How to Memorize Music 1948

References

External links
 Scanned articles from The Etude magazine
 
 
 Online books, University of Pennsylvania

1875 births
1960 deaths
20th-century American dramatists and playwrights
American classical musicians
American writers about music
Classical music critics
American music educators
American magazine editors
Boys High School (Brooklyn) alumni
Recipients of the Legion of Honour
Novelists from Michigan
Musicians from Michigan
People from Bay City, Michigan
Musicians from Brooklyn
Writers from Brooklyn
American expatriates in Germany
20th-century American novelists
American male novelists
Novelists from New York (state)
20th-century American journalists
American male journalists
20th-century American pianists
State University of New York alumni
20th-century American composers
American male dramatists and playwrights
Ohio Northern University alumni
20th-century American male writers